Richard Waugh may refer to:

 Richard Waugh (actor) (born 1961), Canadian voice actor
 Richard Deans Waugh (1868–1938), Canadian politician, mayor of Winnipeg
 Richard E. Waugh (born 1947), Canadian banking executive